This is a list of the bird species recorded in Zimbabwe. The avifauna of Zimbabwe include a total of 709 species, of which 4 have been introduced by humans.

This list's taxonomic treatment (designation and sequence of orders, families and species) and nomenclature (common and scientific names) follow the conventions of The Clements Checklist of Birds of the World, 2022 edition. The family accounts at the beginning of each heading reflect this taxonomy, as do the species counts found in each family account. Introduced and accidental species are included in the total counts for Zimbabwe.

The following tags have been used to highlight several categories, but not all species fall into one of these categories. Those that do not are commonly occurring native species.

(A) Accidental - a species that rarely or accidentally occurs in Zimbabwe
(I) Introduced - a species introduced to Zimbabwe as a consequence, direct or indirect, of human actions

Ostriches
Order: StruthioniformesFamily: Struthionidae

The ostrich is a flightless bird native to Africa. It is the largest living species of bird. It is distinctive in its appearance, with a long neck and legs and the ability to run at high speeds.

Common ostrich, Struthio camelus
South African ostrich, S.c. australis

Ducks, geese, and waterfowl
Order: AnseriformesFamily: Anatidae

Anatidae includes the ducks and most duck-like waterfowl, such as geese and swans. These birds are adapted to an aquatic existence with webbed feet, flattened bills, and feathers that are excellent at shedding water due to an oily coating.

White-faced whistling-duck, Dendrocygna viduata
Fulvous whistling-duck, Dendrocygna bicolor
White-backed duck, Thalassornis leuconotus
Knob-billed duck, Sarkidiornis melanotos
Egyptian goose, Alopochen aegyptiacus
South African shelduck, Tadorna cana (A)
Spur-winged goose, Plectropterus gambensis
African pygmy-goose, Nettapus auritus
Garganey, Spatula querquedula 
Blue-billed teal, Spatula hottentota
Cape shoveler, Spatula smithii
Northern shoveler, Spatula clypeata (A)
African black duck, Anas sparsa
Yellow-billed duck, Anas undulata
Cape teal, Anas capensis
Red-billed duck, Anas erythrorhyncha
Northern pintail, Anas acuta 
Southern pochard, Netta erythrophthalma
Maccoa duck, Oxyura maccoa

Guineafowl
Order: GalliformesFamily: Numididae

Guineafowl are a group of African, seed-eating, ground-nesting birds that resemble partridges, but with featherless heads and spangled grey plumage.

Helmeted guineafowl, Numida meleagris
Western crested guineafowl, Guttera verreauxi

Pheasants, grouse, and allies
Order: GalliformesFamily: Phasianidae

The Phasianidae are a family of terrestrial birds. In general, they are plump (although they vary in size) and have broad, relatively short wings.

Crested francolin, Ortygornis sephaena
Coqui francolin, Campocolinus coqui
Red-winged francolin, Scleroptila levaillantii
Shelley's francolin, Scleroptila shelleyi
Blue quail, Synoicus adansonii
Common quail, Coturnix coturnix
Harlequin quail, Coturnix delegorguei
Red-billed francolin, Pternistis adspersus
Natal francolin, Pternistis natalensis
Swainson's francolin, Pternistis swainsonii
Red-necked francolin, Pternistis afer

Flamingos
Order: PhoenicopteriformesFamily: Phoenicopteridae

Flamingos filter-feed on shellfish and algae. Their oddly shaped beaks are specially adapted to separate mud and silt from the food they consume and, uniquely, are used upside-down.

Greater flamingo, Phoenicopterus roseus
Lesser flamingo, Phoenicopterus minor

Grebes
Order: PodicipediformesFamily: Podicipedidae

Grebes are small to medium-large freshwater diving birds. They have lobed toes and are excellent swimmers and divers. However, they have their feet placed far back on the body, making them quite ungainly on land.

Little grebe, Tachybaptus ruficollis
Great crested grebe, Podiceps cristatus
Eared grebe, Podiceps nigricollis (A)

Pigeons and doves
Order: ColumbiformesFamily: Columbidae

Pigeons and doves are stout-bodied birds with short necks and short slender bills with a fleshy cere.

Rock pigeon, Columba livia (I)
Speckled pigeon, Columba guinea
Rameron pigeon, Columba arquatrix
Delegorgue's pigeon, Columba delegorguei
Lemon dove, Columba larvata
European turtle-dove, Streptopelia turtur (A)
Mourning collared-dove, Streptopelia decipiens
Red-eyed dove, Streptopelia semitorquata
Ring-necked dove, Streptopelia capicola
Laughing dove, Streptopelia senegalensis
Emerald-spotted wood-dove, Turtur chalcospilos
Blue-spotted wood-dove, Turtur afer
Tambourine dove, Turtur tympanistria
Namaqua dove, Oena capensis
African green-pigeon, Treron calvus

Sandgrouse
Order: PterocliformesFamily: Pteroclidae

Sandgrouse have small, pigeon like heads and necks, but sturdy compact bodies. They have long pointed wings and sometimes tails and a fast direct flight. Flocks fly to watering holes at dawn and dusk. Their legs are feathered down to the toes.

Namaqua sandgrouse, Pterocles namaqua
Yellow-throated sandgrouse, Pterocles gutturalis
Double-banded sandgrouse, Pterocles bicinctus
Burchell's sandgrouse, Pterocles burchelli

Bustards
Order: OtidiformesFamily: Otididae

Bustards are large terrestrial birds mainly associated with dry open country and steppes in the Old World. They are omnivorous and nest on the ground. They walk steadily on strong legs and big toes, pecking for food as they go. They have long broad wings with "fingered" wingtips and striking patterns in flight. Many have interesting mating displays.

Kori bustard, Ardeotis kori
Ludwig's bustard, Neotis ludwigii
Denham's bustard, Neotis denhami
Red-crested bustard, Eupodotis ruficrista
Black-bellied bustard, Lissotis melanogaster

Turacos
Order: MusophagiformesFamily: Musophagidae

The turacos, plantain eaters and go-away-birds make up the bird family Musophagidae. They are medium-sized arboreal birds. The turacos and plantain eaters are brightly coloured, usually in blue, green or purple. The go-away birds are mostly grey and white.

Livingstone's turaco, Tauraco livingstonii
Schalow's turaco, Tauraco schalowi
Knysna turaco, Tauraco corythaix
Purple-crested turaco, Tauraco porphyreolophus
Ross's turaco, Musophaga rossae (A)
Gray go-away-bird, Corythaixoides concolor

Cuckoos
Order: CuculiformesFamily: Cuculidae

The family Cuculidae includes cuckoos, roadrunners and anis. These birds are of variable size with slender bodies, long tails and strong legs. The Old World cuckoos are brood parasites.

Senegal coucal, Centropus senegalensis
Coppery-tailed coucal, Centropus cupreicaudus
White-browed coucal, Centropus superciliosus
Black coucal, Centropus grillii
Green malkoha, Ceuthmochares australis
Great spotted cuckoo, Clamator glandarius
Levaillant's cuckoo, Clamator levaillantii
Pied cuckoo, Clamator jacobinus
Thick-billed cuckoo, Pachycoccyx audeberti
Dideric cuckoo, Chrysococcyx caprius
Klaas's cuckoo, Chrysococcyx klaas
African emerald cuckoo, Chrysococcyx cupreus
Barred long-tailed cuckoo, Cercococcyx montanus
Black cuckoo, Cuculus clamosus
Red-chested cuckoo, Cuculus solitarius
Lesser cuckoo, Cuculus poliocephalus 
African cuckoo, Cuculus gularis
Madagascar cuckoo, Cuculus rochii (A)
Common cuckoo, Cuculus canorus

Nightjars and allies
Order: CaprimulgiformesFamily: Caprimulgidae

Nightjars are medium-sized nocturnal birds that usually nest on the ground. They have long wings, short legs and very short bills. Most have small feet, of little use for walking, and long pointed wings. Their soft plumage is camouflaged to resemble bark or leaves.

Pennant-winged nightjar, Caprimulgus vexillarius
Eurasian nightjar, Caprimulgus europaeus
Rufous-cheeked nightjar, Caprimulgus rufigena
Fiery-necked nightjar, Caprimulgus pectoralis
Swamp nightjar, Caprimulgus natalensis
Freckled nightjar, Caprimulgus tristigma
Square-tailed nightjar, Caprimulgus fossii

Swifts
Order: CaprimulgiformesFamily: Apodidae

Swifts are small birds which spend the majority of their lives flying. These birds have very short legs and never settle voluntarily on the ground, perching instead only on vertical surfaces. Many swifts have long swept-back wings which resemble a crescent or boomerang.

Mottled spinetail, Telacanthura ussheri
Bat-like spinetail, Neafrapus boehmi
Scarce swift, Schoutedenapus myoptilus
Alpine swift, Apus melba
Mottled swift, Apus aequatorialis
Common swift, Apus apus
African swift, Apus barbatus
Little swift, Apus affinis
Horus swift, Apus horus
White-rumped swift, Apus caffer
African palm-swift, Cypsiurus parvus

Flufftails
Order: GruiformesFamily: Sarothruridae

The flufftails are a small family of ground-dwelling birds found only in Madagascar and sub-Saharan Africa.

Buff-spotted flufftail, Sarothrura elegans
Red-chested flufftail, Sarothrura rufa
Streaky-breasted flufftail, Sarothrura boehmi
Striped flufftail, Sarothrura affinis
White-winged flufftail, Sarothrura ayresi (A)

Rails, gallinules and coots
Order: GruiformesFamily: Rallidae

Rallidae is a large family of small to medium-sized birds which includes the rails, crakes, coots and gallinules. Typically they inhabit dense vegetation in damp environments near lakes, swamps or rivers. In general they are shy and secretive birds, making them difficult to observe. Most species have strong legs and long toes which are well adapted to soft uneven surfaces. They tend to have short, rounded wings and to be weak fliers.

African rail, Rallus caerulescens
Corn crake, Crex crex
African crake, Crex egregia
Spotted crake, Porzana porzana
Lesser moorhen, Paragallinula angulata
Eurasian moorhen, Gallinula chloropus
Red-knobbed coot, Fulica cristata
Allen's gallinule, Porphyrio alleni
Purple gallinule, Porphyrio martinicus (A)
African swamphen, Porphyrio madagascariensis
Striped crake, Aenigmatolimnas marginalis
Black crake, Zapornia flavirostra
Baillon's crake, Zapornia pusilla

Finfoots
Order: GruiformesFamily: Heliornithidae

Heliornithidae is a small family of tropical birds with webbed lobes on their feet similar to those of grebes and coots.

African finfoot, Podica senegalensis

Cranes
Order: GruiformesFamily: Gruidae

Cranes are large, long-legged and long-necked birds. Unlike the similar-looking but unrelated herons, cranes fly with necks outstretched, not pulled back. Most have elaborate and noisy courting displays or "dances".

Gray crowned-crane, Balearica regulorum
Wattled crane, Bugeranus carunculatus

Thick-knees
Order: CharadriiformesFamily: Burhinidae

The thick-knees are a group of largely tropical waders in the family Burhinidae. They are found worldwide within the tropical zone, with some species also breeding in temperate Europe and Australia. They are medium to large waders with strong black or yellow-black bills, large yellow eyes and cryptic plumage. Despite being classed as waders, most species have a preference for arid or semi-arid habitats.

Water thick-knee, Burhinus vermiculatus
Spotted thick-knee, Burhinus capensis

Stilts and avocets
Order: CharadriiformesFamily: Recurvirostridae

Recurvirostridae is a family of large wading birds, which includes the avocets and stilts. The avocets have long legs and long up-curved bills. The stilts have extremely long legs and long, thin, straight bills.

Black-winged stilt, Himantopus himantopus
Pied avocet, Recurvirostra avosetta

Plovers and lapwings
Order: CharadriiformesFamily: Charadriidae

The family Charadriidae includes the plovers, dotterels and lapwings. They are small to medium-sized birds with compact bodies, short, thick necks and long, usually pointed, wings. They are found in open country worldwide, mostly in habitats near water.

Black-bellied plover, Pluvialis squatarola
Pacific golden-plover, Pluvialis fulva
Long-toed lapwing, Vanellus crassirostris
Blacksmith lapwing, Vanellus armatus
Spur-winged lapwing, Vanellus spinosus (A)
White-headed lapwing, Vanellus albiceps
Senegal lapwing, Vanellus lugubris
Crowned lapwing, Vanellus coronatus
Wattled lapwing, Vanellus senegallus
Lesser sand-plover, Charadrius mongolus (A)
Greater sand-plover, Charadrius leschenaultii (A)
Caspian plover, Charadrius asiaticus
Kittlitz's plover, Charadrius pecuarius
Common ringed plover, Charadrius hiaticula
Little ringed plover, Charadrius dubius (A)
Three-banded plover, Charadrius tricollaris
White-fronted plover, Charadrius marginatus
Chestnut-banded plover, Charadrius pallidus

Painted-snipes
Order: CharadriiformesFamily: Rostratulidae

Painted-snipes are short-legged, long-billed birds similar in shape to the true snipes, but more brightly coloured.

Greater painted-snipe, Rostratula benghalensis

Jacanas
Order: CharadriiformesFamily: Jacanidae

The jacanas are a group of tropical waders in the family Jacanidae. They are found throughout the tropics. They are identifiable by their huge feet and claws which enable them to walk on floating vegetation in the shallow lakes that are their preferred habitat.

Lesser jacana, Microparra capensis
African jacana, Actophilornis africanus

Sandpipers and allies
Order: CharadriiformesFamily: Scolopacidae

Scolopacidae is a large diverse family of small to medium-sized shorebirds including the sandpipers, curlews, godwits, shanks, tattlers, woodcocks, snipes, dowitchers and phalaropes. The majority of these species eat small invertebrates picked out of the mud or soil. Variation in length of legs and bills enables multiple species to feed in the same habitat, particularly on the coast, without direct competition for food.

Whimbrel, Numenius phaeopus
Eurasian curlew, Numenius arquata
Bar-tailed godwit, Limosa lapponica (A)
Black-tailed godwit, Limosa limosa (A)
Ruddy turnstone, Arenaria interpres
Ruff, Calidris pugnax
Broad-billed sandpiper, Calidris falcinellus
Curlew sandpiper, Calidris ferruginea
Sanderling, Calidris alba
Little stint, Calidris minuta
Pectoral sandpiper, Calidris melanotos (A)
Great snipe, Gallinago media
African snipe, Gallinago nigripennis
Terek sandpiper, Xenus cinereus
Red-necked phalarope, Phalaropus lobatus
Red phalarope, Phalaropus fulicarius (A)
Common sandpiper, Actitis hypoleucos
Green sandpiper, Tringa ochropus
Spotted redshank, Tringa erythropus (A)
Common greenshank, Tringa nebularia
Lesser yellowlegs, Tringa flavipes (A)
Marsh sandpiper, Tringa stagnatilis
Wood sandpiper, Tringa glareola
Common redshank, Tringa totanus

Buttonquail
Order: CharadriiformesFamily: Turnicidae

The buttonquail are small, drab, running birds which resemble the true quails. The female is the brighter of the sexes and initiates courtship. The male incubates the eggs and tends the young.

Small buttonquail, Turnix sylvatica
Black-rumped buttonquail, Turnix nanus

Pratincoles and coursers
Order: CharadriiformesFamily: Glareolidae

Glareolidae is a family of wading birds comprising the pratincoles, which have short legs, long pointed wings and long forked tails, and the coursers, which have long legs, short wings and long, pointed bills which curve downwards.

Temminck's courser, Cursorius temminckii
Double-banded courser, Smutsornis africanus
Three-banded courser, Rhinoptilus cinctus
Bronze-winged courser, Rhinoptilus chalcopterus
Collared pratincole, Glareola pratincola
Black-winged pratincole, Glareola nordmanni
Rock pratincole, Glareola nuchalis

Gulls, terns, and skimmers
Order: CharadriiformesFamily: Laridae

Laridae is a family of medium to large seabirds, the gulls, terns, and skimmers. Gulls are typically grey or white, often with black markings on the head or wings. They have stout, longish bills and webbed feet. Terns are a group of generally medium to large seabirds typically with grey or white plumage, often with black markings on the head. Most terns hunt fish by diving but some pick insects off the surface of fresh water. Terns are generally long-lived birds, with several species known to live in excess of 30 years. Skimmers are a small family of tropical tern-like birds. They have an elongated lower mandible which they use to feed by flying low over the water surface and skimming the water for small fish.

Gray-hooded gull, Chroicocephalus cirrocephalus
Black-headed gull, Chroicocephalus ridibundus (A)
Lesser black-backed gull, Larus fuscus
Sooty tern, Onychoprion fuscatus (A)
Gull-billed tern, Gelochelidon nilotica (A)
Caspian tern, Hydroprogne caspia
White-winged tern, Chlidonias leucopterus
Whiskered tern, Chlidonias hybrida
African skimmer, Rynchops flavirostris

Northern storm-petrels
Order: ProcellariiformesFamily: Hydrobatidae

Though the members of this family are similar in many respects to the southern storm-petrels, including their general appearance and habits, there are enough genetic differences to warrant their placement in a separate family.

European storm-petrel, Hydrobates pelagicus (A)

Storks
Order: CiconiiformesFamily: Ciconiidae

Storks are large, long-legged, long-necked, wading birds with long, stout bills. Storks are mute, but bill-clattering is an important mode of communication at the nest. Their nests can be large and may be reused for many years. Many species are migratory.

African openbill, Anastomus lamelligerus
Black stork, Ciconia nigra
Abdim's stork, Ciconia abdimii
African woolly-necked stork, Ciconia microscelis
White stork, Ciconia ciconia
Saddle-billed stork, Ephippiorhynchus senegalensis
Marabou stork, Leptoptilos crumenifer
Yellow-billed stork, Mycteria ibis

Frigatebirds
Order: SuliformesFamily: Fregatidae

Frigatebirds are large seabirds usually found over tropical oceans. They are large, black-and-white, or completely black, with long wings and deeply forked tails. The males have colored inflatable throat pouches. They do not swim or walk and cannot take off from a flat surface. Having the largest wingspan-to-body-weight ratio of any bird, they are essentially aerial, able to stay aloft for more than a week.

Lesser frigatebird, Fregata ariel (A)
Great frigatebird, Fregata minor (A)

Anhingas
Order: SuliformesFamily: Anhingidae

Anhingas or darters are often called "snake-birds" because of their long thin neck, which gives a snake-like appearance when they swim with their bodies submerged. The males have black and dark-brown plumage, an erectile crest on the nape and a larger bill than the female. The females have much paler plumage especially on the neck and underparts. The darters have completely webbed feet and their legs are short and set far back on the body. Their plumage is somewhat permeable, like that of cormorants, and they spread their wings to dry after diving.

African darter, Anhinga melanogaster

Cormorants and shags
Order: SuliformesFamily: Phalacrocoracidae

Phalacrocoracidae is a family of medium to large coastal, fish-eating seabirds that includes cormorants and shags. Plumage colouration varies, with the majority having mainly dark plumage, some species being black-and-white and a few being colourful.

Long-tailed cormorant, Microcarbo africanus
Great cormorant, Phalacrocorax carbo

Pelicans
Order: PelecaniformesFamily: Pelecanidae

Pelicans are large water birds with a distinctive pouch under their beak. As with other members of the order Pelecaniformes, they have webbed feet with four toes.

Great white pelican, Pelecanus onocrotalus
Pink-backed pelican, Pelecanus rufescens

Hammerkop
Order: PelecaniformesFamily: Scopidae

The hammerkop is a medium-sized bird with a long shaggy crest. The shape of its head with a curved bill and crest at the back is reminiscent of a hammer, hence its name. Its plumage is drab-brown all over.

Hamerkop, Scopus umbretta

Herons, egrets, and bitterns
Order: PelecaniformesFamily: Ardeidae

The family Ardeidae contains the bitterns, herons and egrets. Herons and egrets are medium to large wading birds with long necks and legs. Bitterns tend to be shorter necked and more wary. Members of Ardeidae fly with their necks retracted, unlike other long-necked birds such as storks, ibises and spoonbills.

Great bittern, Botaurus stellaris (A)
Little bittern, Ixobrychus minutus
Dwarf bittern, Ixobrychus sturmii
Gray heron, Ardea cinerea
Black-headed heron, Ardea melanocephala
Goliath heron, Ardea goliath
Purple heron, Ardea purpurea
Great egret, Ardea alba
Intermediate egret, Ardea intermedia
Little egret, Egretta garzetta
Slaty egret, Egretta vinaceigula 
Black heron, Egretta ardesiaca'
Cattle egret, Bubulcus ibisSquacco heron, Ardeola ralloidesMalagasy pond-heron, Ardeola idae 
Rufous-bellied heron, Ardeola rufiventrisStriated heron, Butorides striataBlack-crowned night-heron, Nycticorax nycticoraxWhite-backed night-heron, Gorsachius leuconotusIbises and spoonbills
Order: PelecaniformesFamily: Threskiornithidae

Threskiornithidae is a family of large terrestrial and wading birds which includes the ibises and spoonbills. They have long, broad wings with 11 primary and about 20 secondary feathers. They are strong fliers and despite their size and weight, very capable soarers.

Glossy ibis, Plegadis falcinellusAfrican sacred ibis, Threskiornis aethiopicusHadada ibis, Bostrychia hagedashAfrican spoonbill, Platalea albaSecretarybird
Order: AccipitriformesFamily: Sagittariidae

The secretarybird is a bird of prey in the order Accipitriformes but is easily distinguished from other raptors by its long crane-like legs.

Secretarybird, Sagittarius serpentariusOsprey
Order: AccipitriformesFamily: Pandionidae

The family Pandionidae contains only one species, the osprey. The osprey is a medium-large raptor which is a specialist fish-eater with a worldwide distribution.

Osprey, Pandion haliaetusHawks, eagles, and kites
Order: AccipitriformesFamily: Accipitridae

Accipitridae is a family of birds of prey, which includes hawks, eagles, kites, harriers and Old World vultures. These birds have powerful hooked beaks for tearing flesh from their prey, strong legs, powerful talons and keen eyesight.

Black-winged kite, Elanus caeruleusAfrican harrier-hawk, Polyboroides typusPalm-nut vulture, Gypohierax angolensis (A)
Bearded vulture, Gypaetus barbatus (A)
Egyptian vulture, Neophron percnopterus 
European honey-buzzard, Pernis apivorusAfrican cuckoo-hawk, Aviceda cuculoidesWhite-headed vulture, Trigonoceps occipitalisLappet-faced vulture, Torgos tracheliotosHooded vulture, Necrosyrtes monachusWhite-backed vulture, Gyps africanusRüppell's griffon, Gyps rueppelli (A)
Cape griffon, Gyps coprotheresBateleur, Terathopius ecaudatusBlack-chested snake-eagle, Circaetus pectoralisBrown snake-eagle, Circaetus cinereusFasciated snake-eagle, Circaetus fasciolatusBanded snake-eagle, Circaetus cinerascensBat hawk, Macheiramphus alcinusCrowned eagle, Stephanoaetus coronatusMartial eagle, Polemaetus bellicosusLong-crested eagle, Lophaetus occipitalisLesser spotted eagle, Clanga pomarinaWahlberg's eagle, Hieraaetus wahlbergiBooted eagle, Hieraaetus pennatusAyres's hawk-eagle, Hieraaetus ayresiiTawny eagle, Aquila rapaxSteppe eagle, Aquila nipalensisVerreaux's eagle, Aquila verreauxiiAfrican hawk-eagle, Aquila spilogasterLizard buzzard, Kaupifalco monogrammicusDark chanting-goshawk, Melierax metabatesPale chanting-goshawk, Melierax canorusGabar goshawk, Micronisus gabarGrasshopper buzzard, Butastur rufipennis (A)
Eurasian marsh-harrier, Circus aeruginosusAfrican marsh-harrier, Circus ranivorusPallid harrier, Circus macrourusMontagu's harrier, Circus pygargusAfrican goshawk, Accipiter tachiroShikra, Accipiter badiusLittle sparrowhawk, Accipiter minullusOvampo sparrowhawk, Accipiter ovampensisRufous-breasted sparrowhawk, Accipiter rufiventrisBlack goshawk, Accipiter melanoleucusBlack kite, Milvus migransAfrican fish-eagle, Haliaeetus vociferCommon buzzard, Buteo buteoForest buzzard, Buteo trizonatus (A)
Red-necked buzzard, Buteo auguralis (A)
Augur buzzard, Buteo augurJackal buzzard, Buteo rufofuscus (A)

Barn-owls
Order: StrigiformesFamily: Tytonidae

Barn owls are medium to large owls with large heads and characteristic heart-shaped faces. They have long strong legs with powerful talons.

African grass-owl, Tyto capensisBarn owl, Tyto albaOwls
Order: StrigiformesFamily: Strigidae

The typical owls are small to large solitary nocturnal birds of prey. They have large forward-facing eyes and ears, a hawk-like beak and a conspicuous circle of feathers around each eye called a facial disk.

Eurasian scops-owl, Otus scopsAfrican scops-owl, Otus senegalensisSouthern white-faced owl, Ptilopsis grantiCape eagle-owl, Bubo capensisSpotted eagle-owl, Bubo africanusVerreaux's eagle-owl, Bubo lacteusPel's fishing-owl, Scotopelia peliPearl-spotted owlet, Glaucidium perlatumAfrican barred owlet, Glaucidium capenseAfrican wood-owl, Strix woodfordiiMarsh owl, Asio capensisMousebirds
Order: ColiiformesFamily: Coliidae

The mousebirds are slender greyish or brown birds with soft, hairlike body feathers and very long thin tails. They are arboreal and scurry through the leaves like rodents in search of berries, fruit and buds. They are acrobatic and can feed upside down. All species have strong claws and reversible outer toes. They also have crests and stubby bills.

Speckled mousebird, Colius striatusRed-faced mousebird, Urocolius indicusTrogons
Order: TrogoniformesFamily: Trogonidae

The family Trogonidae includes trogons and quetzals. Found in tropical woodlands worldwide, they feed on insects and fruit, and their broad bills and weak legs reflect their diet and arboreal habits. Although their flight is fast, they are reluctant to fly any distance. Trogons have soft, often colourful, feathers with distinctive male and female plumage.

Narina trogon, Apaloderma narinaHoopoes
Order: BucerotiformesFamily: Upupidae

Hoopoes have black, white and orangey-pink colouring with a large erectile crest on their head.

Eurasian hoopoe, Upupa epopsWoodhoopoes
Order: BucerotiformesFamily: Phoeniculidae

The woodhoopoes are related to the kingfishers, rollers and hoopoes. They most resemble the hoopoes with their long curved bills, used to probe for insects, and short rounded wings. However, they differ in that they have metallic plumage, often blue, green or purple, and lack an erectile crest.

Green woodhoopoe, Phoeniculus purpureusCommon scimitarbill, Rhinopomastus cyanomelasGround-hornbills
Order:Bucerotiformes Family: Bucorvidae

The ground-hornbills are terrestrial birds which feed almost entirely on insects, other birds, snakes, and amphibians. The entire family is endemic to Africa.

Southern ground-hornbill, Bucorvus leadbeateriHornbills
Order: BucerotiformesFamily: Bucerotidae

Hornbills are a group of birds whose bill is shaped like a cow's horn, but without a twist, sometimes with a casque on the upper mandible. Frequently, the bill is brightly coloured.

Crowned hornbill, Lophoceros alboterminatusBradfield's hornbill, Lophoceros bradfieldiAfrican gray hornbill, Lophoceros nasutusSouthern yellow-billed hornbill, Tockus leucomelasSouthern red-billed hornbill, Tockus rufirostrisSilvery-cheeked hornbill, Bycanistes brevisTrumpeter hornbill, Bycanistes bucinatorKingfishers
Order: CoraciiformesFamily: Alcedinidae

Kingfishers are medium-sized birds with large heads, long, pointed bills, short legs and stubby tails.

Half-collared kingfisher, Alcedo semitorquataMalachite kingfisher, Corythornis cristatusAfrican pygmy kingfisher, Ispidina pictaGray-headed kingfisher, Halcyon leucocephalaWoodland kingfisher, Halcyon senegalensisMangrove kingfisher, Halcyon senegaloides (A)
Brown-hooded kingfisher, Halcyon albiventrisStriped kingfisher, Halcyon chelicutiGiant kingfisher, Megaceryle maximusPied kingfisher, Ceryle rudisBee-eaters
Order: CoraciiformesFamily: Meropidae

The bee-eaters are a group of near passerine birds in the family Meropidae. Most species are found in Africa but others occur in southern Europe, Madagascar, Australia and New Guinea. They are characterised by richly coloured plumage, slender bodies and usually elongated central tail feathers. All are colourful and have long downturned bills and pointed wings, which give them a swallow-like appearance when seen from afar.

White-fronted bee-eater, Merops bullockoidesLittle bee-eater, Merops pusillusSwallow-tailed bee-eater, Merops hirundineusWhite-throated bee-eater, Merops albicollis (A)
Böhm's bee-eater, Merops boehmiBlue-cheeked bee-eater, Merops persicusMadagascar bee-eater, Merops superciliosusEuropean bee-eater, Merops apiasterSouthern carmine bee-eater, Merops nubicoidesRollers
Order: CoraciiformesFamily: Coraciidae

Rollers resemble crows in size and build, but are more closely related to the kingfishers and bee-eaters. They share the colourful appearance of those groups with blues and browns predominating. The two inner front toes are connected, but the outer toe is not.

European roller, Coracias garrulusLilac-breasted roller, Coracias caudataRacket-tailed roller, Coracias spatulataRufous-crowned roller, Coracias naeviaBroad-billed roller, Eurystomus glaucurusAfrican barbets
Order: PiciformesFamily: Lybiidae

The African barbets are plump birds, with short necks and large heads. They get their name from the bristles which fringe their heavy bills. Most species are brightly coloured.

Crested barbet, Trachyphonus vaillantiiWhite-eared barbet, Stactolaema leucotisWhyte's barbet, Stactolaema whytiiYellow-rumped tinkerbird, Pogoniulus bilineatusYellow-fronted tinkerbird, Pogoniulus chrysoconusPied barbet, Tricholaema leucomelasBlack-collared barbet, Lybius torquatusHoneyguides
Order: PiciformesFamily: Indicatoridae

Honeyguides are among the few birds that feed on wax. They are named for the greater honeyguide which leads traditional honey-hunters to bees' nests and, after the hunters have harvested the honey, feeds on the remaining contents of the hive.

Green-backed honeyguide, Prodotiscus zambesiaeWahlberg's honeyguide, Prodotiscus regulusPallid honeyguide, Indicator meliphilusLesser honeyguide, Indicator minorScaly-throated honeyguide, Indicator variegatusGreater honeyguide, Indicator indicatorWoodpeckers
Order: PiciformesFamily: Picidae

Woodpeckers are small to medium-sized birds with chisel-like beaks, short legs, stiff tails and long tongues used for capturing insects. Some species have feet with two toes pointing forward and two backward, while several species have only three toes. Many woodpeckers have the habit of tapping noisily on tree trunks with their beaks.

Rufous-necked wryneck, Jynx ruficollis (A)
Cardinal woodpecker, Chloropicus fuscescensBearded woodpecker, Chloropicus namaquusOlive woodpecker, Chloropicus griseocephalus (A)
Green-backed woodpecker, Campethera cailliautiiBennett's woodpecker, Campethera bennettiiGolden-tailed woodpecker, Campethera abingoniFalcons and caracaras
Order: FalconiformesFamily: Falconidae

Falconidae is a family of diurnal birds of prey. They differ from hawks, eagles and kites in that they kill with their beaks instead of their talons.

Lesser kestrel, Falco naumanniEurasian kestrel, Falco tinnunculusRock kestrel, Falco rupicolusGreater kestrel, Falco rupicoloidesDickinson's kestrel, Falco dickinsoniRed-necked falcon, Falco chicqueraRed-footed falcon, Falco vespertinusAmur falcon, Falco amurensisEleonora's falcon, Falco eleonorae (A)
Sooty falcon, Falco concolor (A)
Eurasian hobby, Falco subbuteoAfrican hobby, Falco cuvieriiLanner falcon, Falco biarmicusPeregrine falcon, Falco peregrinusTaita falcon, Falco fasciinuchaOld World parrots
Order: PsittaciformesFamily: Psittaculidae

Characteristic features of parrots include a strong curved bill, an upright stance, strong legs, and clawed zygodactyl feet. Many parrots are vividly colored, and some are multi-colored. Old World parrots are found from Africa east across south and southeast Asia and Oceania to Australia and New Zealand.

Rose-ringed parakeet, Psittacula krameri  (I)
Lilian's lovebird, Agapornis lilianaeBlack-cheeked lovebird, Agapornis nigrigenis  (I)

New World and African parrots
Order: PsittaciformesFamily: Psittacidae

Characteristic features of parrots include a strong curved bill, an upright stance, strong legs, and clawed zygodactyl feet. Many parrots are vividly colored, and some are multi-colored. Most of the more than 150 species in this family are found in the New World.

Brown-necked parrot, Poicephalus robustusMeyer's parrot, Poicephalus meyeriBrown-headed parrot, Poicephalus cryptoxanthusAfrican and green broadbills
Order: PasseriformesFamily: Calyptomenidae

The broadbills are small, brightly coloured birds, which feed on fruit and also take insects in flycatcher fashion, snapping their broad bills. Their habitat is canopies of wet forests.

African broadbill, Smithornis capensisPittas
Order: PasseriformesFamily: Pittidae

Pittas are medium-sized by passerine standards and are stocky, with fairly long, strong legs, short tails and stout bills. Many are brightly coloured. They spend the majority of their time on wet forest floors, eating snails, insects and similar invertebrates.

African pitta, Pitta angolensisCuckooshrikes
Order: PasseriformesFamily: Campephagidae

The cuckooshrikes are small to medium-sized passerine birds. They are predominantly greyish with white and black, although some species are brightly coloured.

Gray cuckooshrike, Coracina caesiaWhite-breasted cuckooshrike, Coracina pectoralisBlack cuckooshrike, Campephaga flavaOld World orioles
Order: PasseriformesFamily: Oriolidae

The Old World orioles are colourful passerine birds. They are not related to the New World orioles.

Eurasian golden oriole, Oriolus oriolusAfrican golden oriole, Oriolus auratusGreen-headed oriole, Oriolus chlorocephalusAfrican black-headed oriole, Oriolus larvatusWattle-eyes and batises
Order: PasseriformesFamily: Platysteiridae

The wattle-eyes, or puffback flycatchers, are small stout passerine birds of the African tropics. They get their name from the brightly coloured fleshy eye decorations found in most species in this group.

Black-throated wattle-eye, Platysteira peltataCape batis, Batis capensisWoodward's batis, Batis fratrumChinspot batis, Batis molitorPale batis, Batis sororVangas, helmetshrikes, and allies
Order: PasseriformesFamily: Vangidae

The helmetshrikes are similar in build to the shrikes, but tend to be colourful species with distinctive crests or other head ornaments, such as wattles, from which they get their name.

White helmetshrike, Prionops plumatusRetz's helmetshrike, Prionops retziiChestnut-fronted helmetshrike, Prionops scopifronsBlack-and-white shrike-flycatcher, Bias musicusBushshrikes and allies
Order: PasseriformesFamily: Malaconotidae

Bushshrikes are similar in habits to shrikes, hunting insects and other small prey from a perch on a bush. Although similar in build to the shrikes, these tend to be either colourful species or largely black; some species are quite secretive.

Brubru, Nilaus aferBlack-backed puffback, Dryoscopus cublaMarsh tchagra, Tchagra minutaBlack-crowned tchagra, Tchagra senegalaBrown-crowned tchagra, Tchagra australisThree-streaked tchagra, Tchagra jamesiTropical boubou, Laniarius majorGabon boubou, Laniarius bicolorSouthern boubou, Laniarius ferrugineusCrimson-breasted gonolek, Laniarius atrococcineusBokmakierie, Telophorus zeylonusSulphur-breasted bushshrike, Telophorus sulfureopectusOlive bushshrike, Telophorus olivaceusBlack-fronted bushshrike, Telophorus nigrifronsFour-colored bushshrike, Telophorus viridisGray-headed bushshrike, Malaconotus blanchotiDrongos
Order: PasseriformesFamily: Dicruridae

The drongos are mostly black or dark grey in colour, sometimes with metallic tints. They have long forked tails, and some Asian species have elaborate tail decorations. They have short legs and sit very upright when perched, like a shrike. They flycatch or take prey from the ground.

Common square-tailed drongo, Dicrurus ludwigiiFork-tailed drongo, Dicrurus adsimilisMonarch flycatchers
Order: PasseriformesFamily: Monarchidae

The monarch flycatchers are small to medium-sized insectivorous passerines which hunt by flycatching.

African crested-flycatcher, Trochocercus cyanomelasAfrican paradise-flycatcher, Terpsiphone viridisShrikes
Order: PasseriformesFamily: Laniidae

Shrikes are passerine birds known for their habit of catching other birds and small animals and impaling the uneaten portions of their bodies on thorns. A typical shrike's beak is hooked, like a bird of prey.

Red-backed shrike, Lanius collurioLesser gray shrike, Lanius minorMagpie shrike, Lanius melanoleucusSouthern fiscal, Lanius collarisWhite-crowned shrike, Eurocephalus anguitimensCrows, jays, and magpies
Order: PasseriformesFamily: Corvidae

The family Corvidae includes crows, ravens, jays, choughs, magpies, treepies, nutcrackers and ground jays. Corvids are above average in size among the Passeriformes, and some of the larger species show high levels of intelligence.

Cape crow, Corvus capensisPied crow, Corvus albusWhite-necked raven, Corvus albicollisHyliotas
Order: PasseriformesFamily: Hyliotidae

The members of this small family, all of genus Hyliota, are birds of the forest canopy. They tend to feed in mixed-species flocks. The entire family is endemic to Africa.

Yellow-bellied hyliota, Hyliota flavigaster (A)
Southern hyliota, Hyliota australisFairy flycatchers
Order: PasseriformesFamily: Stenostiridae

Most of the species of this small family are found in Africa, though a few inhabit tropical Asia. They are not closely related to other birds called "flycatchers".

Fairy flycatcher, Stenostira scita (A)
White-tailed blue flycatcher, Elminia albicaudaWhite-tailed crested-flycatcher, Elminia albonotataTits, chickadees and titmice
Order: PasseriformesFamily: Paridae

The Paridae are mainly small stocky woodland species with short stout bills. Some have crests. They are adaptable birds, with a mixed diet including seeds and insects.

Rufous-bellied tit, Melaniparus rufiventrisSouthern black-tit, Melaniparus nigerMiombo tit, Melaniparus griseiventrisAshy tit, Melaniparus cinerascensPenduline-tits
Order: PasseriformesFamily: Remizidae

The penduline-tits are a group of small passerine birds related to the true tits. They are insectivores.

African penduline-tit, Anthoscopus caroliSouthern penduline-tit, Anthoscopus minutusLarks
Order: PasseriformesFamily: Alaudidae

Larks are small terrestrial birds with often extravagant songs and display flights. Most larks are fairly dull in appearance. Their food is insects and seeds.

Spike-heeled lark, Chersomanes albofasciataDusky lark, Pinarocorys nigricansChestnut-backed sparrow-lark, Eremopterix leucotisGray-backed sparrow-lark, Eremopterix verticalisSabota lark, Calendulauda sabotaFawn-coloured lark, Calendulauda africanoidesRufous-naped lark, Mirafra africanaFlappet lark, Mirafra rufocinnamomeaMonotonous lark, Mirafra passerinaLatakoo lark, Mirafra chenianaRed-capped lark, Calandrella cinereaStark's lark, Spizocorys starki (A)
Pink-billed lark, Spizocorys conirostrisNicators
Order: PasseriformesFamily: Nicatoridae

The nicators are shrike-like, with hooked bills. They are endemic to sub-Saharan Africa.

Western nicator, Nicator chlorisEastern nicator, Nicator gularisAfrican warblers
Order: PasseriformesFamily: Macrosphenidae

African warblers are small to medium-sized insectivores which are found in a wide variety of habitats south of the Sahara.

Red-capped crombec, Sylvietta ruficapilla (A)
Red-faced crombec, Sylvietta whytiiCape crombec, Sylvietta rufescensMoustached grass-warbler, Melocichla mentalisCape grassbird, Sphenoeacus aferCisticolas and allies
Order: PasseriformesFamily: Cisticolidae

The Cisticolidae are warblers found mainly in warmer southern regions of the Old World. They are generally very small birds of drab brown or grey appearance found in open country such as grassland or scrub.

Yellow-bellied eremomela, Eremomela icteropygialisGreencap eremomela, Eremomela scotopsBurnt-neck eremomela, Eremomela usticollisRoberts's warbler, Oreophilais robertsiMiombo wren-warbler, Calamonastes undosusStierling's wren-warbler, Calamonastes stierlingiBarred wren-warbler, Calamonastes fasciolatusGreen-backed camaroptera, Camaroptera brachyuraBar-throated apalis, Apalis thoracicaYellow-breasted apalis, Apalis flavidaBlack-headed apalis, Apalis melanocephalaChirinda apalis, Apalis chirindensisTawny-flanked prinia, Prinia subflavaBlack-chested prinia, Prinia flavicansRed-winged prinia, Prinia erythropteraRed-faced cisticola, Cisticola erythropsSinging cisticola, Cisticola cantansRock-loving cisticola, Cisticola aberransRattling cisticola, Cisticola chinianaTinkling cisticola, Cisticola rufilatusWailing cisticola, Cisticola laisLuapula cisticola, Cisticola luapulaChirping cisticola, Cisticola pipiensRufous-winged cisticola, Cisticola galactotesLevaillant's cisticola, Cisticola tinniensCroaking cisticola, Cisticola natalensisPiping cisticola, Cisticola fulvicapillaSiffling cisticola, Cisticola brachypterusZitting cisticola, Cisticola juncidisDesert cisticola, Cisticola aridulusPale-crowned cisticola, Cisticola cinnamomeusWing-snapping cisticola, Cisticola ayresiiReed warblers and allies
Order: PasseriformesFamily: Acrocephalidae

The members of this family are usually rather large for "warblers". Most are rather plain olivaceous brown above with much yellow to beige below. They are usually found in open woodland, reedbeds, or tall grass. The family occurs mostly in southern to western Eurasia and surroundings, but it also ranges far into the Pacific, with some species in Africa.

African yellow-warbler, Iduna natalensisOlive-tree warbler, Hippolais olivetorumIcterine warbler, Hippolais icterinaSedge warbler, Acrocephalus schoenobaenusMarsh warbler, Acrocephalus palustrisCommon reed warbler, Acrocephalus scirpaceusBasra reed warbler, Acrocephalus griseldis (A)
Lesser swamp warbler, Acrocephalus gracilirostrisGreater swamp warbler, Acrocephalus rufescensGreat reed warbler, Acrocephalus arundinaceusGrassbirds and allies
Order: PasseriformesFamily: Locustellidae

Locustellidae are a family of small insectivorous songbirds found mainly in Eurasia, Africa, and the Australian region. They are smallish birds with tails that are usually long and pointed, and tend to be drab brownish or buffy all over.

River warbler, Locustella fluviatilisFan-tailed grassbird, Catriscus brevirostrisBarratt's warbler, Bradypterus barrattiLittle rush warbler, Bradypterus baboecalaSwallows
Order: PasseriformesFamily: Hirundinidae

The family Hirundinidae is adapted to aerial feeding. They have a slender streamlined body, long pointed wings and a short bill with a wide gape. The feet are adapted to perching rather than walking, and the front toes are partially joined at the base.

Plain martin, Riparia paludicolaBank swallow, Riparia ripariaBanded martin, Neophedina cinctaMascarene martin, Phedina borbonica  (A)
Rock martin, Ptyonoprogne fuligulaBarn swallow, Hirundo rusticaWhite-throated swallow, Hirundo albigularisWire-tailed swallow, Hirundo smithiiPearl-breasted swallow, Hirundo dimidiataMontane blue swallow, Hirundo atrocaeruleaGreater striped swallow, Cecropis cucullataRed-rumped swallow, Cecropis daurica (A)
Lesser striped swallow, Cecropis abyssinicaRufous-chested swallow, Cecropis semirufaMosque swallow, Cecropis senegalensisSouth African swallow, Petrochelidon spiloderaCommon house-martin, Delichon urbicumWhite-headed sawwing, Psalidoprocne albiceps (A)
Black sawwing, Psalidoprocne pristopteraGray-rumped swallow, Pseudhirundo griseopygaBulbuls
Order: PasseriformesFamily: Pycnonotidae

Bulbuls are medium-sized songbirds. Some are colourful with yellow, red or orange vents, cheeks, throats or supercilia, but most are drab, with uniform olive-brown to black plumage. Some species have distinct crests.

Sombre greenbul, Andropadus importunusStripe-cheeked greenbul, Arizelocichla milanjensisYellow-bellied greenbul, Chlorocichla flaviventrisTerrestrial brownbul, Phyllastrephus terrestrisYellow-streaked greenbul, Phyllastrephus flavostriatusTiny greenbul, Phyllastrephus debilisRed-whiskered bulbul, Pycnonotus jocosusCommon bulbul, Pycnonotus barbatusBlack-fronted bulbul, Pycnonotus nigricansLeaf warblers
Order: PasseriformesFamily: Phylloscopidae

Leaf warblers are a family of small insectivorous birds found mostly in Eurasia and ranging into Wallacea and Africa. The species are of various sizes, often green-plumaged above and yellow below, or more subdued with grayish-green to grayish-brown colors.

Willow warbler, Phylloscopus trochilusYellow-throated woodland-warbler, Phylloscopus ruficapillaBush warblers and allies
Order: PasseriformesFamily: Scotocercidae

The members of this family are found throughout Africa, Asia, and Polynesia. Their taxonomy is in flux, and some authorities place genus Erythrocerus in another family.

Livingstone's flycatcher, Erythrocercus livingstoneiSylviid warblers, parrotbills, and allies
Order: PasseriformesFamily: Sylviidae

The family Sylviidae is a group of small insectivorous passerine birds. They mainly occur as breeding species, as the common name implies, in Europe, Asia and, to a lesser extent, Africa. Most are of generally undistinguished appearance, but many have distinctive songs.

Eurasian blackcap, Sylvia atricapilla (A)
Garden warbler, Sylvia borinBarred warbler, Curruca nisoriaChestnut-vented warbler, Curruca subcoeruleaGreater whitethroat, Curruca communisWhite-eyes, yuhinas, and allies
Order: PasseriformesFamily: Zosteropidae

The white-eyes are small and mostly undistinguished, their plumage above being generally some dull colour like greenish-olive, but some species have a white or bright yellow throat, breast or lower parts, and several have buff flanks. As their name suggests, many species have a white ring around each eye.

Southern yellow white-eye, Zosterops anderssoniLaughingthrushes and allies
Order: PasseriformesFamily: Leiothrichidae

The members of this family are diverse in size and colouration, though those of genus Turdoides tend to be brown or greyish. The family is found in Africa, India, and southeast Asia.

Arrow-marked babbler, Turdoides jardineiiSouthern pied-babbler, Turdoides bicolorHartlaub's babbler, Turdoides hartlaubiiTreecreepers
Order: PasseriformesFamily: Certhiidae

Treecreepers are small woodland birds, brown above and white below. They have thin pointed down-curved bills, which they use to extricate insects from bark. They have stiff tail feathers, like woodpeckers, which they use to support themselves on vertical trees.

African spotted creeper, Salpornis salvadoriOxpeckers
Order: PasseriformesFamily: Buphagidae

As both the English and scientific names of these birds imply, they feed on ectoparasites, primarily ticks, found on large mammals. The entire family is endemic to Africa.

Red-billed oxpecker, Buphagus erythrorhynchusYellow-billed oxpecker, Buphagus africanusStarlings
Order: PasseriformesFamily: Sturnidae

Starlings are small to medium-sized passerine birds. Their flight is strong and direct and they are very gregarious. Their preferred habitat is fairly open country. They eat insects and fruit. Plumage is typically dark with a metallic sheen.

Wattled starling, Creatophora cinereaCommon myna, Acridotheres tristis (I)
Violet-backed starling, Cinnyricinclus leucogasterRed-winged starling, Onychognathus morioBlack-bellied starling, Notopholia corruscaBurchell's starling, Lamprotornis australisMeves's starling, Lamprotornis mevesii (A)
Lesser blue-eared starling, Lamprotornis chloropterusGreater blue-eared starling, Lamprotornis chalybaeusCape starling, Lamprotornis nitensThrushes and allies
Order: PasseriformesFamily: Turdidae

The thrushes are a group of passerine birds that occur mainly in the Old World. They are plump, soft plumaged, small to medium-sized insectivores or sometimes omnivores, often feeding on the ground. Many have attractive songs.

Orange ground-thrush, Geokichla gurneyiGroundscraper thrush, Turdus litsitsirupaKurrichane thrush, Turdus libonyanaOlive thrush, Turdus olivaceusOld World flycatchers
Order: PasseriformesFamily: Muscicapidae

Old World flycatchers are a large group of small passerine birds native to the Old World. They are mainly small arboreal insectivores. The appearance of these birds is highly varied, but they mostly have weak songs and harsh calls.

African dusky flycatcher, Muscicapa adustaSpotted flycatcher, Muscicapa striataMariqua flycatcher, Bradornis mariquensisPale flycatcher, Agricola pallidusGray tit-flycatcher, Fraseria plumbeaAshy flycatcher, Fraseria caerulescensFiscal flycatcher, Melaenornis silens (A)
Southern black-flycatcher, Melaenornis pammelainaBearded scrub-robin, Cercotrichas quadrivirgataKalahari scrub-robin, Cercotrichas paenaRed-backed scrub-robin, Cercotrichas leucophrysCape robin-chat, Cossypha caffraWhite-throated robin-chat, Cossypha humeralisWhite-browed robin-chat, Cossypha heugliniRed-capped robin-chat, Cossypha natalensisCollared palm-thrush, Cichladusa arquataWhite-starred robin, Pogonocichla stellataSwynnerton's robin, Swynnertonia swynnertoniWhite-throated robin, Irania gutturalisThrush nightingale, Luscinia lusciniaEuropean pied flycatcher, Ficedula hypoleucaCollared flycatcher, Ficedula albicollis 
Common redstart, Phoenicurus phoenicurus (A)
Short-toed rock-thrush, Monticola brevipesMiombo rock-thrush, Monticola angolensisWhinchat, Saxicola rubetra (A)
African stonechat, Saxicola torquatusMocking cliff-chat, Thamnolaea cinnamomeiventrisSouthern anteater-chat, Myrmecocichla formicivora (A)
Arnot's chat, Myrmecocichla arnottiNorthern wheatear, Oenanthe oenanthe (A)
Capped wheatear, Oenanthe pileataPied wheatear, Oenanthe pleschanka (A)
Familiar chat, Oenanthe familiarisBoulder chat, Pinarornis plumosusSugarbirds
Order: PasseriformesFamily: Promeropidae

The sugarbirds resemble large sunbirds in general appearance and habits, but are possibly more closely related to the Australian honeyeaters. They have brownish plumage, the long downcurved bill of passerine nectar feeders and long tail feathers.

Gurney's sugarbird, Promerops gurneyiSunbirds and spiderhunters
Order: PasseriformesFamily: Nectariniidae

The sunbirds and spiderhunters are very small passerine birds which feed largely on nectar, although they will also take insects, especially when feeding young. Flight is fast and direct on their short wings. Most species can take nectar by hovering like a hummingbird, but usually perch to feed.

Plain-backed sunbird, Anthreptes reichenowiWestern violet-backed sunbird, Anthreptes longuemareiCollared sunbird, Hedydipna collarisOlive sunbird, Cyanomitra olivaceaMouse-colored sunbird, Cyanomitra veroxii (A)
Amethyst sunbird, Chalcomitra amethystinaScarlet-chested sunbird, Chalcomitra senegalensisBronze sunbird, Nectarinia kilimensisMalachite sunbird, Nectarinia famosaWestern Miombo sunbird, Cinnyris gertrudisEastern Miombo sunbird, Cinnyris manoensisMariqua sunbird, Cinnyris mariquensisShelley's sunbird, Cinnyris shelleyiPurple-banded sunbird, Cinnyris bifasciatusWhite-breasted sunbird, Cinnyris talatalaVariable sunbird, Cinnyris venustusCopper sunbird, Cinnyris cupreusWeavers and allies
Order: PasseriformesFamily: Ploceidae

The weavers are small passerine birds related to the finches. They are seed-eating birds with rounded conical bills. The males of many species are brightly coloured, usually in red or yellow and black, some species show variation in colour only in the breeding season.

Red-billed buffalo-weaver, Bubalornis nigerScaly weaver, Sporopipes squamifronsWhite-browed sparrow-weaver, Plocepasser mahaliRed-headed weaver, Anaplectes rubricepsSpectacled weaver, Ploceus ocularisHolub's golden-weaver, Ploceus xanthopsSouthern brown-throated weaver, Ploceus xanthopterusLesser masked-weaver, Ploceus intermediusSouthern masked-weaver, Ploceus velatusVillage weaver, Ploceus cucullatusForest weaver, Ploceus bicolorCardinal quelea, Quelea cardinalis (A)
Red-headed quelea, Quelea erythrops 
Red-billed quelea, Quelea queleaSouthern red bishop, Euplectes orixBlack-winged bishop, Euplectes hordeaceusYellow-crowned bishop, Euplectes aferYellow bishop, Euplectes capensisWhite-winged widowbird, Euplectes albonotatusYellow-mantled widowbird, Euplectes macrouraRed-collared widowbird, Euplectes ardensFan-tailed widowbird, Euplectes axillarisLong-tailed widowbird, Euplectes progneGrosbeak weaver, Amblyospiza albifronsWaxbills and allies
Order: PasseriformesFamily: Estrildidae

The estrildid finches are small passerine birds of the Old World tropics and Australasia. They are gregarious and often colonial seed eaters with short thick but pointed bills. They are all similar in structure and habits, but have wide variation in plumage colours and patterns.

Bronze mannikin, Spermestes cucullatusMagpie mannikin, Spermestes fringilloidesBlack-and-white mannikin, Spermestes bicolorYellow-bellied waxbill, Coccopygia quartiniaSwee waxbill, Coccopygia melanotisGreen-backed twinspot, Mandingoa nitidulaRed-faced crimsonwing, Cryptospiza reichenoviiBlack-faced waxbill, Brunhilda erythronotosBlack-tailed waxbill, Glaucestrilda perreiniCommon waxbill, Estrilda astrildQuailfinch, Ortygospiza atricollisLocustfinch, Paludipasser locustellaCut-throat, Amadina fasciataRed-headed finch, Amadina erythrocephalaZebra waxbill, Amandava subflavaViolet-eared waxbill, Granatina granatinaSouthern cordonbleu, Uraeginthus angolensisLesser seedcracker, Pyrenestes minorGreen-winged pytilia, Pytilia melbaOrange-winged pytilia, Pytilia afraPeters's twinspot, Hypargos niveoguttatusRed-billed firefinch, Lagonosticta senegalaAfrican firefinch, Lagonosticta rubricataJameson's firefinch, Lagonosticta rhodopareiaBrown firefinch, Lagonosticta nitidulaIndigobirds
Order: PasseriformesFamily: Viduidae

The indigobirds are finch-like species which usually have black or indigo predominating in their plumage. All are brood parasites, which lay their eggs in the nests of estrildid finches.

Pin-tailed whydah, Vidua macrouraBroad-tailed paradise-whydah, Vidua obtusaEastern paradise-whydah, Vidua paradisaeaShaft-tailed whydah, Vidua regiaVillage indigobird, Vidua chalybeataVariable indigobird, Vidua funereaPurple indigobird, Vidua purpurascensGreen indigobird, Vidua codringtoniParasitic weaver, Anomalospiza imberbisOld World sparrows
Order: PasseriformesFamily: Passeridae

Old World sparrows are small passerine birds. In general, sparrows tend to be small, plump, brown or grey birds with short tails and short powerful beaks. Sparrows are seed eaters, but they also consume small insects.

House sparrow, Passer domesticus (I)
Great rufous sparrow, Passer motitensisCape sparrow, Passer melanurusNorthern gray-headed sparrow, Passer griseus (A)
Southern gray-headed sparrow, Passer diffususYellow-throated bush sparrow, Gymnoris superciliarisWagtails and pipits
Order: PasseriformesFamily: Motacillidae

Motacillidae is a family of small passerine birds with medium to long tails. They include the wagtails, longclaws and pipits. They are slender, ground feeding insectivores of open country.

Cape wagtail, Motacilla capensisMountain wagtail, Motacilla claraGray wagtail, Motacilla cinerea (A)
Western yellow wagtail, Motacilla flavaAfrican pied wagtail, Motacilla aguimpWhite wagtail, Motacilla albaAfrican pipit, Anthus cinnamomeusWoodland pipit, Anthus nyassaeNicholson's pipit, Anthus nicholsoniPlain-backed pipit, Anthus leucophrysBuffy pipit, Anthus vaalensisStriped pipit, Anthus lineiventrisTree pipit, Anthus trivialisShort-tailed pipit, Anthus brachyurus (A)
Bush pipit, Anthus cafferGolden pipit, Tmetothylacus tenellus (A)
Orange-throated longclaw, Macronyx capensisYellow-throated longclaw, Macronyx croceusRosy-throated longclaw, Macronyx ameliaeFinches, euphonias, and allies
Order: PasseriformesFamily: Fringillidae

Finches are seed-eating passerine birds, that are small to moderately large and have a strong beak, usually conical and in some species very large. All have twelve tail feathers and nine primaries. These birds have a bouncing flight with alternating bouts of flapping and gliding on closed wings, and most sing well.

Yellow-fronted canary, Crithagra mozambicaAfrican citril, Crithagra citrinelloidesBlack-faced canary, Crithagra capistrataBlack-throated canary, Crithagra atrogularisLemon-breasted seedeater, Crithagra citrinipectusBrimstone canary, Crithagra sulphurataBlack-eared seedeater, Crithagra mennelliStreaky-headed seedeater, Crithagra gularisCape canary, Serinus canicollisOld World buntings
Order: PasseriformesFamily: Emberizidae

The emberizids are a large family of passerine birds. They are seed-eating birds with distinctively shaped bills. Many emberizid species have distinctive head patterns.

Cabanis's bunting, Emberiza cabanisiGolden-breasted bunting, Emberiza flaviventrisCape bunting, Emberiza capensisLark-like bunting, Emberiza impetuaniCinnamon-breasted bunting, Emberiza tahapisi''

See also
List of birds
Lists of birds by region

References

External links
Birds of Zimbabwe - World Institute for Conservation and Environment

Zimbabwe
Zimbabwe
birds
Zimbabwe